Hofgaardtoppen is a mountain in Oscar II Land at Spitsbergen, Svalbard. The mountain has a height of 1,125 m.a.s.l. and is located southwest of Uvêrsbreen. It is named after Norwegian military officer Hans Jacob Hofgaard. Hofgaardtoppen is the highest mountain in Oscar II Land.

References

Mountains of Spitsbergen